The following companies owned land in the Greater Toronto Area Greenbelt at the time that the Ontario Government proposed to develop the greenbelt:

Richmond Hill area 

 Seven companies owned by Vaughan-based construction family De Gasperis family, owners of Tacc Developments, Tacc Construction. Arista Homes, Opus Homes and Decast Ltd. Companies include Tacc Developments (Block 41) Inc, Leslie Elgin Developments Inc.

King Township 

 Green Lane Bathurst GP Inc. owns five parcels of land. Green Lane Bathurst GP's president is president Michal Rice, owner of Rice Group.

Stouffville 

 Torca II Inc (president Marcelo Perez-Hassaf)
 A numbered company with the same directors as Torca II Inc
 2502536 Ontario Limited (president: Weixiang Wang)

Markham 

 Three numbered companies, also with the president Weixiang Wang)
 Flato Upper Markham Village Inc. (president: Shakir Rehmatullah)
 Minotar Holdings

Clarington 

 Nash Road Developments (president: Peter Tanenbaum)

Ajax 

 
 A numbered company (president elect: Yuchen Lu of Fuyang, China)

See also 
 Premiership of Doug Ford

References 

Lists of companies of Canada
Lists of companies
Nature conservation in Canada